Second Air Mechanic William Walker DCM was a World War I flying ace credited with five aerial victories.

References

British World War I flying aces
Year of birth missing
Year of death missing
Royal Flying Corps soldiers
Recipients of the Distinguished Conduct Medal